Lilies of the Ghetto  is a 2009 film.

Synopsis
Ijaloko, an ex-convict and a ghetto chief, abducts five kids from his neighborhood: Johnnie, Small, Konkolo, Fryo and Bobo. He brainwashes them and induces them into using hard-drugs, thereby destroying all their humanity and turning them into a menace to society in order to achieve his wishes. Four of the kids die, one after the other. Johnnie, the luckiest of them all, survives and decides to quit being a gangster and go back to school. Ijaloko will do everything in his power to stop him.

Nominations
The film was nominated for the 6th Africa Movie Academy Awards for Most Promising Actor for Sunny Chikezie, Best Editing and Best Costume Design.

External links

2009 films
Nigerian action films